MHC class II regulatory factor RFX1 is a protein that, in humans, is encoded by the RFX1 gene located on the short arm of chromosome 19.

Structure 

The RFX1 gene is a member of the regulatory factor X (RFX) gene family, which encodes transcription factors that contain five conserved domains including a highly conserved, centrally located, winged helix DNA binding domain as well as a dimerization domain located in the C-terminal region of the sequence. Apart from the five conserved domains, the RFX proteins diverge significantly. The DNA binding and dimerization domains of the RFX family proteins show no similarities to the other domains with the same functions in other proteins.

Species distribution 

The RFX protein family is conserved in S. pombe, S. cerevisiae, C. elegans, mice and humans. There are seven known RFX proteins in humans, five in mice, and one in C. elegans as well as one in each of the two species of yeast.

Function 

The protein encoded by this gene is structurally related to regulatory factors X2, X3, X4, and X5. It is a transcriptional activator that can bind DNA as a monomer or as a heterodimer with RFX family members X2, X3, and X5, but not with X4. This protein binds to the Xboxes of MHC class II genes and is essential for their expression.  Also, it can bind to an inverted repeat that is required for expression of hepatitis B virus genes. The RFX proteins were originally cloned and characterized due to their high affinity for a cis-acting promoter sequence, called the Xbox, found in all MHC class II genes.

Levels of mRNA encoding this protein as well as RFX2 and RFX3 are found to be consistently elevated in the testis and are variable in other tissues throughout the body.

RFX1 contains a C-terminal sequence with no apparent homology to other RFX proteins. This C-terminal tail contains an acidic region that is thought to aid in crossing the nuclear membrane. Two major functions are hypothesized to this exist for this domain: a contribution to the nuclear localization signal (NLS) as well as the contradictory down-regulation of DNA binding as well as nuclear association. These two functions were originally identified through sequence mutations and translational fusions with gfp (green fluorescent protein) and remain to be confirmed.

Interactions 

RFX1 has been shown to interact with Abl gene.

References

Further reading

External links 
 

Transcription factors